The Liquid Elastomer Molding (LEM) gasket consists of a metallic core, coated in selected areas on both sides with a thin layer of silicone with molded-in sealing beads. These beads have differing heights and widths dependent on the clamping load distribution and application requirements. The base elastomer coating provides a good overall micro-seal with the silicone beads ensuring optimum sealing in the critical areas. LEM can also include molding on its edge either for sealing of high pressure fluids or for T joints between mating flanges.

References

Seals (mechanical)